Death Valley is a 1946 American Naturalcolor Western film directed by Lew Landers and starring Nat Pendleton, Helen Gilbert and Robert Lowery.

Plot
A dance hall girl is murdered and her killer flees to Death Valley.

Cast
 Nat Pendleton as Jim Ward
 Helen Gilbert as Joan Bagley
 Robert Lowery as Steve
 Sterling Holloway as Slim
 Barbara Read as Mitzi (as Barbara Reed)
 Russell Simpson as Old Silas Bagley
 Paul Hurst as Sergeant Dailey
 Dick Scott as Sam Duff - Assayer
 Stanley Price as 2nd Assayer (as Stan Price)
 Robert Benton as Duke (as Bob Benton)

References

External links
 
 Death Valley at BFI
 Death Valley at Letterbox DVD
 Death Valley at TCMDB

1946 films
American Western (genre) films
Films directed by Lew Landers
1946 Western (genre) films
Lippert Pictures films
1940s English-language films
1940s American films